Diogo Jorge Moreno Valente (born 23 September 1984) is a Portuguese professional footballer who plays as a left winger for S.C. Salgueiros.

He totalled 193 Primeira Liga games and 18 goals for seven clubs, including as a fringe player for Porto and Braga. Having started his professional career at Boavista, he also played three top-flight campaigns for Académica, where he won the Taça de Portugal in 2012.

Club career

Boavista
Valente was born in Aveiro. A product of Boavista FC's youth system, he made his professional debut for the northerners in the 2004–05 season and quickly established himself as first-choice as the team achieved two consecutive sixth places in the Primeira Liga.

Previously, Valente served a one-year loan at G.D. Chaves in the Segunda Liga.

Porto
In July 2006, Valente signed for an undisclosed fee with FC Porto but, in January 2007, after appearing just once (albeit in an important match, a 1–1 away draw against Sporting CP), he was loaned to C.S. Marítimo, where he scored at C.D. Aves (another away fixture, same score).

Valente was loaned again from 2007 to 2009, this time at Leixões S.C. which had returned to the top division for 2007–08. Alongside teammates Paulo Machado and Vieirinha, also loaned by Porto, he proved instrumental as the Matosinhos club not only retained its league status but finished in a best-ever sixth position the following campaign.

Braga and Académica
On 1 July 2009, Valente left Porto by mutual agreement, joining S.C. Braga for an undisclosed fee. As the Minho side finished in a best-ever second place, he appeared rarely, sometimes not even making the squad of 18.

Valente featured regularly for Académica de Coimbra during 2010–11, on loan. On 29 June 2011, he terminated his contract with Braga and signed a one-year deal with the Students; in the first year in his second spell he again rarely missed a game, and scored once in seven appearances in the season's Taça de Portugal, which ended in conquest after 73 years.

Later years
In late May 2012, Valente joined Romanian club CFR Cluj on a three-year contract, where he shared teams with a host of compatriots. He scored three competitive goals during his stint at the Stadionul Dr. Constantin Rădulescu, including one in the defeat to FC Dinamo București in the Supercupa României (on penalties, following a 2–2 draw in regulation time).

On 20 August 2015, after an unassuming top-flight spell at Gil Vicente FC (less than one third of the games, relegation), 30-year-old Valente moved abroad again and signed a one-year deal with Şanlıurfaspor in the Turkish TFF First League. He returned to his country and its division two at the end of the campaign, representing in quick succession S.C. Freamunde and U.D. Oliveirense.

Valente dropped into the third tier for the first time in his career in July 2019, with S.C. Espinho. Two years later, he continued at that level with S.C. Salgueiros.

International career
Valente earned his first cap for the Portugal under-21 team on 29 March 2005, featuring 89 minutes in a 1–0 away win over Slovakia for the 2006 UEFA European Championship qualifiers.

Career statistics

Honours
Porto
Primeira Liga: 2006–07

Académica
Taça de Portugal: 2011–12

References

External links

1984 births
Living people
People from Aveiro, Portugal
Sportspeople from Aveiro District
Portuguese footballers
Association football wingers
Primeira Liga players
Liga Portugal 2 players
Campeonato de Portugal (league) players
Boavista F.C. players
G.D. Chaves players
FC Porto players
C.S. Marítimo players
Leixões S.C. players
S.C. Braga players
Associação Académica de Coimbra – O.A.F. players
Gil Vicente F.C. players
S.C. Freamunde players
U.D. Oliveirense players
S.C. Espinho players
S.C. Salgueiros players
Liga I players
CFR Cluj players
TFF First League players
Şanlıurfaspor footballers
Portugal under-21 international footballers
Portugal B international footballers
Portuguese expatriate footballers
Expatriate footballers in Romania
Expatriate footballers in Turkey
Portuguese expatriate sportspeople in Romania
Portuguese expatriate sportspeople in Turkey